Kynoch is a surname. Notable people with the surname include:

George Kynoch (disambiguation)
 George Kynoch (businessman) (1834–1891), founder of IMI plc, Conservative Member of Parliament (MP) for Aston Manor
 George Kynoch (Kincardine and Deeside MP) (born 1946), Scottish Conservative Party MP
John Kynoch (born 1933), British sport shooter
Sholto Kynoch, English pianist